Raisa Davydovna Orlova-Kopeleva (23 July 1918, Moscow – 31 May 1989, Cologne) was a Russian writer and American studies scholar.

She was the second wife of Lev Kopelev.

Selected works
Books
Die Türen öffnen sich langsam (1984), Двери открываются медленно (1994)
Memoirs (USA 1983), Eine Vergangenheit, die nicht vergeht. Rückblicke aus fünf Jahrzehnten (1985), Воспоминания о непрошедшем времени (Moscow 1993)
Briefe aus Köln über Bücher aus Moskau (1987)
Als die Glocke verstummte; Alexander Herzens letztes Lebensjahr (1988) 
Warum ich lebe (1990. posthumous)
With Lev Kopelev
 Boris Pasternak. „Bild der Welt im Wort“ (1986)
 Wir lebten in Moskau (1987), Мы жили в Москве (1) (USA 1988, Moscow 1990)
 Zeitgenossen, Meister, Freunde (1989), Мы жили в Москве (2)
 Wir lebten in Köln. Aufzeichnungen und Erinnerungen (1996), Мы жили в Кёльне (2003)

Articles

Further reading

External links
 

1918 births
1989 deaths
Writers from Moscow
Russian women writers
20th-century women writers
20th-century Russian writers
Soviet dissidents
20th-century Russian women